Masalhan (also Romanized as Maṣalḥān; also known as Qal‘eh, Qal‘eh Khalīfeh (Persian: قلعه خليفه), and Qal‘eh-ye Khalīfeh) is a village in Kamazan-e Sofla Rural District, Zand District, Malayer County, Hamadan Province, Iran. At the 2006 census, its population was 609, in 162 families.

References 

Populated places in Malayer County